Samuel Fessenden (April 12, 1847 – January 7, 1908) was an American lawyer, politician, and Civil War veteran.

The son of Samuel C. Fessenden, he was born and raised in Maine, where he attended Lewiston Falls Academy (now Edward Little High School). He served in the Union Army during the American Civil War in the Seventh Maine Volunteer Battery, eventually reaching the rank of second lieutenant in the First Maine Volunteer Battery. He later moved to Connecticut and served as a member of the Connecticut House of Representatives and Connecticut Senate. He served as President pro tempore of the Connecticut Senate. He was a state's attorney for Fairfield County. He was also a candidate for the U.S. Senate and a delegate to multiple Republican National Conventions.

He is best remembered outside of Connecticut for shouting from the floor of the 1896 Republican National Convention at Joseph Manley that "God Almighty hates a quitter" when it was becoming apparent that the candidate they were both supporting wasn't going to win the nomination.

References

1847 births
1908 deaths
Connecticut lawyers
People of Maine in the American Civil War
Republican Party Connecticut state senators
Republican Party members of the Connecticut House of Representatives
Fessenden family
People from Fairfield County, Connecticut
Politicians from Auburn, Maine
Presidents pro tempore of the Connecticut Senate
19th-century American politicians
Union Army officers